The Manning River railway bridge is a heritage-listed railway bridge that carries the North Coast line across the Manning River located at Mount George, near  in the Mid-Coast Council local government area of New South Wales, Australia. The bridge is also known as the Mount George Rail Bridge over Manning River. The property is owned by RailCorp, an agency of the Government of New South Wales. It was added to the New South Wales State Heritage Register on 2 April 1999.

History 

The bridge was built in 1911. It was manufactured by R. Tulloch and Co. Ltd of Phoenix Ironworks in Pyrmont, Sydney, and was erected by A. S. Norquay for Smith, Timms & Co., contractors for the Gloucester to Taree section of the North Coast railway line.

It underwent repairs in 2005-2006.

Description 

It is a steel truss bridge comprising four  spans.

Heritage listing 
The underbridge over the Manning River is a typical structure on the North Coast railway line and a major structure in the local area.

The Taree rail bridge over Manning River was listed on the New South Wales State Heritage Register on 2 April 1999 having satisfied the following criteria.

The place possesses uncommon, rare or endangered aspects of the cultural or natural history of New South Wales.

This item is assessed as historically rare. This item is assessed as arch. rare. This item is assessed as socially rare.

See also 

List of railway bridges in New South Wales

References

Attribution 

New South Wales State Heritage Register
Taree
Railway bridges in New South Wales
Articles incorporating text from the New South Wales State Heritage Register
Bridges completed in 1911
1911 establishments in Australia
Truss bridges in Australia
Steel bridges in Australia